Des Dillon (born 25 January 1980) is an Irish rugby union footballer. Dillon emerged as a schoolboy talent at Clongowes Wood College. He was captain of the Clongowes Wood College Senior Cup Team that won the Leinster Schools Cup in 1998. He played backrow and second-row for Leinster Rugby until he retired in 2007. He continued to play at amateur level for Blackrock College RFC in the AIL (All Ireland League), becoming the club's captain. He played 67 times in total for Leinster Rugby, scoring 4 tries.

References

1980 births
Living people
Irish rugby union players
Leinster Rugby players
Ospreys (rugby union) players